Park Gu-il (15 March 1944 – 1984) was a South Korean boxer. He competed at the 1964 Summer Olympics and the 1968 Summer Olympics.

References

1944 births
1984 deaths
South Korean male boxers
Olympic boxers of South Korea
Boxers at the 1964 Summer Olympics
Boxers at the 1968 Summer Olympics
People from Geoje
Sportspeople from South Gyeongsang Province
Asian Games medalists in boxing
Boxers at the 1966 Asian Games
Asian Games gold medalists for South Korea
Medalists at the 1966 Asian Games
Welterweight boxers